Liceo Bicentenario Óscar Castro Zúñiga is a Chilean high school located in Rancagua, Cachapoal Province, Chile.

Notable alumni

 Buddy Richard, singer;
 Óscar Hahn, writer and poet;

References

Educational institutions established in 1846
1846 establishments in Chile
Secondary schools in Chile
Schools in Cachapoal Province